Reheapification is a term promoted by some C++ textbooks to describe the process of fixing a binary search tree heap data structure, after a node is either removed or added.  Other authors refer to the process of bubble up or bubble down.

References

C++